Ismed Sofyan (born 28 August 1979) is an Indonesian professional footballer who plays for Liga 2 club Persiraja Banda Aceh. He normally plays as a right back or a wing back and his height is 169 cm. His speciality are free kick taking and assisting with high-curved pass. He has made 53 appearances for the Indonesia national football team.

Club career
His first club career is at PSBL Langsa before he moved to Persiraja Banda Aceh. In 2002, he moved to Persijatim Jakarta Timur (currently known as Sriwijaya FC) for two seasons. After that, he moved to Persija Jakarta. He has been playing for Persija Jakarta since 2002 and make him as the most long serving period player in the club until now. In Persija, he commonly linked with Bambang Pamungkas as a great duo. He is the current captain of Persija Jakarta along with Andritany Ardhiyasa as vice-captain.

International career
He played for both Indonesia U-19 and U-23 teams from 1997 to 2001. His first appearance for senior team was in Asian Cup 2000 in Lebanon. He substituted for Budi Sudarsono at the second round in second game for Indonesia against Saudi Arabia in Group D Asian Cup 2007. He's been listed for one of the most highest caps in Indonesia national team as a right defender.

International goals

|}

Honours

Country honors
Indonesia
Indonesian Independence Cup: 2000, 2008
AFF Championship runner-up: 2000, 2004

Club

Persija Jakarta
 Liga 1: 2018
 Indonesia President's Cup: 2018

References

External links

1979 births
Living people
Indonesian footballers
Indonesia international footballers
2000 AFC Asian Cup players
2004 AFC Asian Cup players
2007 AFC Asian Cup players
Acehnese people
Sportspeople from Aceh
Liga 1 (Indonesia) players
Indonesian Premier Division players
PSBL Langsa players
Persiraja Banda Aceh players
Sriwijaya F.C. players
Persija Jakarta players
Association football defenders